USA Weekend was an American weekend newspaper magazine owned by the Gannett Company. Structured as a sister publication to Gannett's flagship newspaper USA Today and distributed in the Sunday editions of participating local newspapers, it was at its peak the country's second-largest national magazine supplement (behind Parade) and was distributed to more than 800 newspapers nationwide.

Overview
The publication was incorporated as Family Weekly, a supplement started in 1953. By the mid-1980s, the magazine was carried in 362 newspapers nationwide for a total circulation of 12.8 million copies, making it the third-largest weekly magazine in the U.S., ranking behind its main competitor Parade (owned since 1976 by Advance Publications, which sold it to Athlon Media Group in 2014) and TV Guide. 

The Gannett Company purchased the supplement from CBS, Inc. on February 21, 1985. When the sale was finalized later that spring, Gannett renamed the publication USA Weekend and designated 1985 as its founding year for promotional purposes and anniversary observances. Most of the newspapers that Gannett owned soon carried USA Weekend within their Sunday editions as their default magazine supplement.

USA Weekend focused its articles on social issues, entertainment personalities and pop culture, health, food reviews and recipes, and travel. In addition to Parade, USA Weekend also competed alongside some Sunday magazines published for individual newspapers in select U.S. cities such as The New York Times Magazine. The magazine provided Newspaper In Education classroom guides to partner newspapers, for use by teachers to provide educational material for students.

Shutdown
On December 5, 2014, Gannett announced that it would cease publication of USA Weekend with the December 26–28, 2014, edition and lay off 30 advertising and editorial staffers. The shutdown was reportedly due to mounting distribution costs and a decline in advertising revenue (revenue for Sunday magazines through advertising buys had decreased by 10.9% year-over-year between the first two quarters of 2013 and the first half of 2014. USA Weekend lost up to $10 million in operating costs during the 2013 and 2014 fiscal years), which in previous years had resulted in the shift from the carrier newspapers paying a licensing fee to Gannett to publishers of these papers receiving a fee from the company for distributing USA Weekend (a structure that had also affected other syndicated Sunday magazines). As well, the supplement's circulation had declined, shrinking from the mid-2000s high of up to 70 million copies distributed through newsstand sales and home-delivery newspaper subscriptions down to around 18 million in 2014. For its final years of publication, the magazine had relied on writers and columnists from USA Today to help provide feature content for the magazine, after Gannett laid off several members of USA Weekends writing staff.

The decision to cease publication of the supplement came one year after Gannett began distributing a seven-day-a-week supplement featuring condensed content from USA Today for syndication to the company's own local newspapers as well as partner newspapers owned by other publishers, with company executives said the supplement's Weekend Life section provided better content than USA Weekend. The end of USA Weekend left Parade as the only weekend newspaper magazine published in the United States. Parade, which had only appeared previously in acquired Gannett newspapers to fulfill contracts with previous owners, has now returned to many Gannett newspapers as a replacement for USA Weekend.

Columns
Columns and contributors featured in USA Weekend included:
 CookSmart – a recipe column written by Ellie Krieger
 EatSmart – a food column by Jean Carper, focusing on healthy recipes and tips
 HealthSmart – a health information column written by the hosts of The Doctors
 MoneySmart – a financial advice column written by Sharon Epperson and Walecia Konrad
 Who's News – a column focusing on newsmakers of the past week, written by Lorrie Lynch
 Wit&Wisdom – a feature focusing on humor and insight, written by Terry Stickels

Other notable contributors included:
 Ken Burns
 Steven V. Roberts
 Cokie Roberts
 Tavis Smiley

Make a Difference Day
In 1992, USA Weekends Make a Difference Day created an annual community service event, held on the fourth Saturday of October.

At the 2013 event, the company gave 14 community groups $10,000 to donate to their local charities.

References

External links

 

Lifestyle magazines published in the United States
Weekly magazines published in the United States
Defunct magazines published in the United States
Former CBS Corporation subsidiaries
Gannett publications
Magazines established in 1953
Magazines disestablished in 2014
Newspaper supplements
Sunday magazines
Former Gannett subsidiaries
USA Today